Natiruts is a Brazilian reggae band from Brasília. Formed in 1996, Natiruts has released six studio albums and five live albums during a career spanning three decades. The group released its debut album Nativus in 1997 and increased in popularity through its 2009 album Raçaman and the accompanying single "Sorri, Sou Rei". The group's 2012 album Acústico was nominated for Best Brazilian Contemporary Pop Album at the 2013 Latin Grammy Awards.

History
Natiruts formed in 1996 after a barbecue in which lead vocalist Alexandre Carlo proposed the idea of popularizing reggae in Brazil. The band changed its name several times in its early stages, beginning with the name Nativus, which was already taken, then to Os Nativos, then to Natiruts Reggae Power Ao Vivo, which was later shortened to Natiruts. Having formed in Brasília, Natiruts deviated from the local rock scene in the city by singing about spirituality and environmentalism. Despite the band's perception that the city was not the "ideal environment" for tropical music in that it lacked beaches and other aspects associated with the genre, the group demonstrated strong reggae influences since its formation. The band's debut album, Nativus, was released in 1997.

Despite gaining local popularity in its formative years, Natiruts' 2009 album Raçaman, was viewed as the group's breakthrough album. In 2009, the band released the song "Sorri, Sou Rei", which became one of the group's signature songs. The group's 2012 album Acústico was nominated for Best Brazilian Contemporary Pop Album at the 2013 Latin Grammy Awards, but lost to Músicas Para Churrasco Vol. 1 Ao Vivo by Seu Jorge. On October 1, 2016, Natiruts performed at the SOMOS event in Puerto Rico to celebrate the twentieth anniversary of the formation of Puerto Rican reggae band Cultura Profética. The band's 2017 music video for "Sol do Meu Amanhecer" featured Game of Thrones actor Diogo Sales and Miss Brazil 2016 Raissa Santana. Lead vocalist Alexandre Carlo participated in a virtual Mother's Day festival on May 10, 2020 during the COVID-19 pandemic.

In 2021, their song "Lágrimas de Alegria" (with Maneva) was nominated for the Latin Grammy Award for Best Portuguese Language Song.

Artistry 
The band is primarily reggae but has also incorporated elements of rock, funk, and dancehall. Lyrically, the band discusses spiritual and ecological concerns. American musician Michael Franti, a fan of the group, claims that Natiruts "are legendary in their native Brazil".

Members

Main line-up
 Alexandre Carlo (vocals and rhythm guitar)
 Luís Mauricio (bass)

Additional line-up
 Kiko Peres (lead guitar)
 João Ferreira (acoustic guitars)
 Bruno Wambier (keyboards)
 Lucas Pimentel (drums 
 Denny Conceição  (percussion)

Discography

Studio albums
 1997 - Nativus
 1999 - Povo Brasileiro
 2001 - Verbalize
 2002 - Qu4tro
 2005 - Nossa Missão
 2009 - Raçaman
2017 - Índigo Cristal
 2018 - I Love

Live albums
 2003 - Luau MTV
 2006 - Natiruts Reggae Power Ao Vivo
 2012 - Natiruts Acústico no Rio de Janeiro
 2014 - #NoFilter
 2015 - Reggae Brasil

DVD
 2006 - Natiruts Reggae Power Ao Vivo
 2012 - Acústico no Rio de Janeiro
 2014 - #NoFilter
 2015 - Reggae Brasil

References

External links
Band Official Website
Shows Contact

Brazilian reggae musical groups
Musical groups established in 1996
1996 establishments in Brazil